The 329th Fighter-Interceptor Squadron is an inactive United States Air Force unit.  Its last assignment was with Los Angeles Air Defense Sector at George Air Force Base, California, where it was inactivated on 1 July 1967.

History

World War II
Established in mid-1942 as a IV Fighter Command Operational Training Unit (OTU) with a mission to train fighter pilots on single-engine fighter aircraft.    Later became a Replacement Training Unit (RTU).    Inactivated in early 1944 when the need for fighter pilots was reduced.

Air defense

The squadron was redesignated the 329th Fighter-Interceptor Squadron and reactivated at George Air Force Base, California in August 1955 as part of Air Defense Command's Project Arrow, which was designed to bring back on the active list the fighter units which had compiled memorable records in the two world wars. At George. the squadron replaced the 456th Fighter-Interceptor Squadron, which had been detached from the 520th Air Defense Group at Truax Field, Wisconsin, assuming its North American F-86D Sabres and its mission to provide air defense over the Southern California region.

In the spring of 1957 it received F-86L Sabres and a year later transitioned into Convair F-102A Delta Dagger aircraft. In July 1960 the unit began flying Convair F-106 Delta Darts. The 329th was inactivated on 31 July 1967 as part of the phasedown of ADC.

Lineage
 Constituted as the 329th Fighter Squadron (Single Engine) on 24 June 1942
 Activated on 10 July 1942
 Redesignated 329th Fighter Squadron, Single Engine c. 1 August 1943
 Disbanded on 31 March 1944
 Reconstituted and redesignated 329th Fighter-Interceptor Squadron on 20 June 1955
 Activated on 18 August 1955
 Inactivated on 1 July 1967

Assignments
 328th Fighter Group, 10 July 1942 – 31 March 1944
 27th Air Division, 18 August 1955
 4722d Air Defense Group, 1 December 1956
 27th Air Division, 25 June 1958
 Los Angeles Air Defense Sector, 1 October 1959
 27th Air Division, 1 April 1966 – 1 July 1967

Stations
 Hamilton Field, California, 10 July 1942
 Oakland Municipal Airport California, 2 November 1942
 Portland Army Air Base, Oregon, 7 October 1943
 Concord Army Air Field, California, 18 December 1943 – 31 March 1944.
 George Air Force Base, California, 18 August 1955 – 1 July 1967

Aircraft
 Bell P-39 Airacobra, 1942–1944
 North American F-86D Sabre, 1955–1958
 Convair F-102 Delta Dagger, 1958–1960
 Convair F-106 Delta Dart, 1960–1967

References

 Notes

 Citations

Bibliography

 Buss, Lydus H.(ed), Sturm, Thomas A., Volan, Denys, and McMullen, Richard F., History of Continental Air Defense Command and Air Defense Command July to December 1955, Directorate of Historical Services, Air Defense Command, Ent AFB, CO, (1956)

External links

329
Military units and formations established in 1942
Aerospace Defense Command units
1942 establishments in California
1967 establishments in California